The 1938–39 National Hurling League was the 12th season of the NHL, an annual hurling competition for the GAA county teams.

Overview

The National Hurling League featured three groups of teams - Group A, Group B and Group C.  Waterford remained unbeaten in Group A, after recording three wins and one draw. In Group B Dublin had four wins from their four games. Group C only contained three teams, with Wexford winning both and topping the group. Dublin received a bye into the final, while Waterford defeated Wexford in a lone semi-final. Dublin won the subsequent final.

Division placings

Group A

Group B

Group C

Results

Knock-out stages

References

National Hurling League seasons
League
League